Tingena ancogramma is a species of moth in the family Oecophoridae. It is endemic to New Zealand and has been found in the Hen and Chicken Islands, the North Island and the South Island. Adults are on the wing in summer and autumn and inhabit open areas of forest scrubland.

Taxonomy

This species was first described by Edward Meyrick in 1919 using a specimen collected by George Hudson at  Wainuiomata in December and named Borkhausenia ancogramma. George Hudson discussed and illustrated this species in his 1928 book The butterflies and moths of New Zealand also under the name Borkhausenia ancogramma. In 1939 Hudson synonymised Borkhausenia latens and Borkhausenia bellatula with this species. In 1988 J. S. Dugdale placed this species in the genus Tingena and confirmed synonyms established by Hudson. When discussing Hudson's illustration of this species Dugdale argued that it should be regarded as dubious as the illustration "has a dark patch on the dorsum just before the tornus which is lacking in the holotype". The holotype specimen is held at the Natural History Museum, London.

Description

Meyrick described this species as follows:

Distribution
It is endemic to New Zealand and found in the Hen and Chickens Islands, the North Island and the South Island. It has been observed at its type locality of Wainuiomata as well as at Porirua in the Wellington region, at the Hen and Chickens Islands, Whangārei, Rotorua and at Lake Rotoroa in the South Island.

Behaviour 
This adults of this species are on the wing from late summer to autumn and have been collected from December to February.

Habitat 
This species inhabits open areas in forest scrubland.

References

Oecophoridae
Moths of New Zealand
Moths described in 1919
Endemic fauna of New Zealand
Taxa named by Edward Meyrick
Endemic moths of New Zealand